Viktor Kovalev (25 August 1980) is a retired Kazakhstani professional footballer.

Career
Kovalev appeared in 19 Kazakhstan Premier League matches for FC Alma-Ata during the 2008 season.

Kovalev retired on 1 July 2015, joining the coaching staff of FC Zhetysu.

References

External links
 

Living people
1980 births
Kazakhstani footballers
Association football defenders
FC Zhetysu players